The White Demon (German: Der weiße Dämon) is a 1932 German drama film directed by Kurt Gerron and starring Hans Albers, Gerda Maurus and Peter Lorre. The film is also known by the alternative title of Dope. The sets were designed by the art director Julius von Borsody.

A separate French-language version Narcotics was also made.

Synopsis
A drug dealer gets a rising young female singer addicted to drugs. Her brother decides to hunt him down in revenge.

Cast

References

Bibliography 
 Kreimeier, Klaus. The Ufa Story: A History of Germany's Greatest Film Company, 1918–1945. University of California Press, 1999.

External links 
 

1932 films
1932 crime drama films
German crime drama films
Films of the Weimar Republic
1930s German-language films
Films directed by Kurt Gerron
UFA GmbH films
Films about drugs
German multilingual films
Films about siblings
German black-and-white films
1932 multilingual films
1930s German films